Thomas "Tom" R. Finnin (1927-2003) was a defensive tackle in the National Football League.

Biography
Finnin was born on September 28, 1927 in Chicago, Illinois.

Career
Finnin was drafted in the 24th round of the 1950 NFL Draft by the New York Giants and would later play four seasons with the Baltimore Colts before splitting his final season with the Chicago Cardinals and Green Bay Packers. He played at the collegiate level at the University of Detroit Mercy.

Later life
After being drafted by New York, Finnin went on to serve in the Korean War. When he returned from Korea 
he was traded to the Baltimore Colts. During his time at Baltimore he  became a Chicago police officer in the off season. He continued his police career to become a 33-year veteran of the Chicago Police. Finnin died at the age of 75 on June 22, 2003.

See also
List of Green Bay Packers players

References

1927 births
2003 deaths
Players of American football from Chicago
Baltimore Colts players
Chicago Cardinals players
Green Bay Packers players
American football defensive tackles
Detroit Titans football players